Carmela Corro Tiangco (born August 10, 1955), professionally known as Mel Tiangco, is a Filipino television newscaster and television host. She is one of the news pillars of GMA News and Public Affairs and a multi-awarded news anchor.

Biography
Mel Tiangco was born as Carmela Corro Tiangco on August 10, 1955, in Pilar, Bataan to Arsenio Tiangco, Sr. and Florencia Corro.

After graduating from De La Salle University, she became one of the leading presenters in Philippine television journal programs. She first gained fame by being one of the original anchors of ABS-CBN's flagship newscast TV Patrol from 1987 to 1995. She then transferred to GMA Network and became the anchor of Saksi from 1996 to 1999 and Frontpage: Ulat ni Mel Tiangco from 1999 to 2004. She was also a co-host for talk show Mel & Jay with fellow journalist  Jay Sonza, Mel & Joey with comedian-TV host-writer Joey de Leon, and public affairs show Sanib Puwersa with Arnold Clavio. She also hosted Powerhouse from 2011 to 2013 on GMA News TV. Currently, Tiangco co-anchors GMA's flagship newscast, 24 Oras and hosts the weekly drama anthology Magpakailanman.

She is involved in philanthropic work at the GMA Kapuso Foundation, the network's socio-civic arm. Tiangco served as the foundation's Executive Vice President and Chief Operations Officer until April 2016.

She is the mother of Wency Cornejo, a musician best known as the lead vocalist of Philippine rock band AfterImage (active in the 1990s). Her three other children are Ana Teresa, Melanie and Jose Miguel.

Suspension incident
Tiangco transferred to GMA Network after she was suspended for three months without pay from her former network ABS-CBN over her appearance in a Tide advertisement allegedly without her former network's knowledge. The move was in compliance to an internal company rule which prohibits news personalities from endorsing brands. According to pep.ph, this is universally enforced in all print and broadcast meant to avoid any suspicions of bias or favoritism.

A year later ABS-CBN filed a lawsuit against Tiangco, Jay Sonza, and GMA Network at Quezon City Regional Trial Court, but on June 26, 1998, the court declared the respondents' cancellation of contracts to their former network as valid and that GMA Network had no hand over their decision to transfer. ABS-CBN brought the case to the Court of Appeals, which upheld the lower court's decision on August 6, 2003. According to GMA Network, the network's act of suspension to Tiangco without solid proof and legal basis is a grave breach of contract, and supports her termination of the contract. ABS-CBN later took it to the Supreme Court, which then junked their appeal in 2011 "for failure to sufficiently show any reversible error in the decision of the Court of Appeals." The Supreme Court decision added: "There was no evidence that GMA had enticed Mel and Jay to break away from ABS-CBN because when the two transferred to GMA, they have already rescinded their agreements with ABS-CBN."

Despite the issue, Tiangco garnered support from the public. In the anniversary press conference for her show Magpakailanman on February 18, 2013, she said that she has already forgiven her former network. While she likened her experience in her former network similar to a cockroach being trampled on, she stated that she has already moved on from the suspension incident as she felt "vindicated" by her accomplishments in her current network and her program's success in the Philippine television.

On June 3, 2022, the Supreme Court publicly released its decision dated December 6, 2021, dismissing Tiangco's appeal on the illegal dismissal and illegal suspension case against ABS-CBN.

Television programs

Awards

2013
Edukcircle MOPIP TV Awards

2012
Anak TV Makabata Hall of Famers Award
People of the Year, People Asia Magazine

2008
Most Outstanding Female News Presenter, COMGUILD Center for Journalism

2006
 Most Outstanding Female News Presenter of the Year, COMGUILD Center for Journalism

2004
 Outstanding Broadcast Journalist & Social Servant, Gusi Peace Prize Award
Outstanding Host for Partners Mel & Jay, 1st Golden Screen Awards for Television
Woman of Distinction Award, Soroptimist International

2002
Best Talk Show/Program Host-TV, Partners Mel & Jay, 12th KBP Golden Dove Awards
Best Female Newscaster, Frontpage, Star Awards for Television
Outstanding Citizen of Quezon City for Mass Media

2001
Paralegal ng Bayan Awardee, 16th Huwarang Pilipino Award for Media & Journalism
He & She (HAS) Club Awardee, Outstanding Woman of Bataan
Woman of Distinction Award, Soroptimist International
Best Female Newscaster, Star Awards for Television
Best Female Broadcaster for Television, KBP Golden Dove Awards

2000
Trailblazer Award, Outstanding Alumna, St. Theresa's College

1998
Finalist, Asian Television Awards, Singapore
Ka Doroy Broadcaster of the Year Award, KBP Golden Dove Awards

1996
Finalist, New York International TV Festival, Mel & Jay, TV Host

1995-1997
Best Female Newscaster, Star Awards for Television

1994
Presidential Awardee, Best Non-Government Organization in Public Service, Armed Forces of the Philippines
Presidential Awardee, First Media People's Award
Best Magazine Talk Show Host, Star Awards for Television
Best Female Newscaster, Star Awards for Television
Best Female Celebrity Talk show host, Star Awards for Television

1994-1995
Gintong Ina Awardee, Single Parent of the Year, Golden Mother & Father Foundation

1994
Commendation: Humanitarian Concern, House Resolution No. 35-Series 1995, House of Representatives, Republic of the Philippines
Lifetime Achievement Award, ABS-CBN Broadcasting Corp.
Gintong Ina Awardee, Celebrity Mother of the Year, Golden Mother & Father Foundation, Inc.

1990-1996
Best Female Television Talkshow Host, Star Awards for Television, Philippine Movie Press Club (Hall of Fame)

1990-1993
Pinakamahusay na Programa sa Telebisyon, Gawad Cultural Center of the Philippines Awards for TV, Mel & Jay

1990-1996
Best Female Newscaster, Star Awards for Television, Philippine Movie Press Club

1991-1992
Broadcast Journalism Award, Public Service on Radio (Mel & Jay DZMM), Rotary Club of Manila
TOWNS Awardee, The Outstanding Women in Nation Service (Public Service & Journalism)

1990
Presidential Medallion, Presidential Awardee for Work for the Welfare of the Disabled, Apolinario Mabini Award

1988, 1990
Best Female Newscaster, Star Awards for Television, Philippine Movie Press Club.

Notes

References

1955 births
Living people
De La Salle University alumni
Filipino television personalities
Filipino television news anchors
Filipino reporters and correspondents
Filipino television presenters
ABS-CBN News and Current Affairs people
ABS-CBN personalities
GMA Integrated News and Public Affairs people
GMA Network personalities